Pierre Bellot may refer to:

 Pierre François Bellot (1776–1836), Swiss jurist and politician
 Pierre Bellot (swimmer) (born 1968), French Paralympic swimmer